Too Hot to Handle is the debut album by funk-disco band Heatwave, released on June 15, 1976 on the GTO label in the UK and on May 30, 1977 on the Epic label in the US. It was produced by Barry Blue.

The song "Turn Out the Lamplight" appeared on George Benson's album Give me the Night, a song written by Temperton, which was produced by Quincy Jones.

The album was remastered and reissued with bonus tracks in 2015 by Big Break Records.

Track listing

U.S. Cassette Tape Release

Personnel 
Heatwave
Johnnie Wilder, Jr. – lead (3-9) and backing vocals, percussion
Keith Wilder – lead vocals (1, 2)
Eric Johns – guitars
Rod Temperton – keyboards, synthesizer
Mario Mantese – bass guitar
Ernest "Bilbo" Berger – drums, percussion

Charts

Singles

References

External links
 

1976 debut albums
Heatwave (band) albums
GTO Records albums
Epic Records albums